COVID-19 vaccination in Equatorial Guinea is an ongoing immunisation campaign against severe acute respiratory syndrome coronavirus 2 (SARS-CoV-2), the virus that causes coronavirus disease 2019 (COVID-19), in response to the ongoing pandemic in the country.

Equatorial Guinea began its vaccination program on 15 February 2021, initially with 100,000 doses of the Sinopharm BIBP vaccine donated by China.

Background

History

Timeline

February 2021 
On 11 February 2021, 100,000 donated doses of the Sinopharm BIBP vaccine arrived in Equatorial Guinea from China.

March 2021 
By the end of the month 9,265 doses had been administered.

April 2021 
By the end of the month 55,799 doses had been administered. 8,389 persons had been fully vaccinated.

May 2021 
By the end of the month 219,677 doses had been administered. 71,598 persons had been fully vaccinated.

June 2021 
On 16 June 2021, Equatorial Guinea buys 500,000 doses of the Sinopharm BIBP vaccine. By the end of the month 260,528 doses had been administered. 111,343 persons had been fully vaccinated.

July 2021 
By the end of the month 301,413 doses had been administered. 122,500 persons had been fully vaccinated.

August 2021 
By the end of the month 331,807 doses had been administered. 141,326 persons had been fully vaccinated.

September 2021 
By the end of the month 397,083 doses had been administered. 167,635 persons had been fully vaccinated.

October 2021 
By the end of the month 426,780 doses had been administered. 186,670 persons (32% of the target population) had been fully vaccinated.

November 2021 
By the end of the month 443,135 doses had been administered. 196,616 persons (34% of the target population) had been fully vaccinated.

December 2021 
By the end of the month 452,572 doses had been administered. 203,357 persons (35% of the target population) had been fully vaccinated.

February 2022 
By the end of the month 463,549 doses had been administered. 206,023 persons had been fully vaccinated.

March 2022 
By the end of the month 473,409 doses had been administered. 210,706 persons had been fully vaccinated.

April 2022 
By the end of the month 479,991 doses had been administered. 214,486 persons had been fully vaccinated.

Progress 
Cumulative vaccinations in Equatorial Guinea

References 

Equatorial Guinea
Vaccination
Equatorial Guinea